Scaffold web spiders (Nesticidae) is a family of araneomorph spiders closely allied with tangle web spiders. Like the "Theridiidae", these spiders have a comb of serrated bristles on the hind tarsi that are used to pull silk bands from the spinnerets. It contains 16 genera and about 300 species, many of which are associated with caves or overhangs. The genus Nesticus is the type for the family and is found throughout the world. The related Eidmannella has speciated considerably in Texas caves and includes some extremely localized species that are considered threatened. One species, Eidmannella pallida, is found in caves and under overhangs, but also in agricultural fields and other habitats away from such restricted areas. The genus Carpathonesticus is found in central Eurasia.

Genera

, the World Spider Catalog accepts the following genera:

Aituaria Esyunin & Efimik, 1998 — Ukraine, Russia, Georgia
Canarionesticus Wunderlich, 1992 — Canary Is.
Carpathonesticus Lehtinen & Saaristo, 1980 — Europe, Asia
Cyclocarcina Komatsu, 1942 — Japan
Domitius Ribera, 2018 — Spain, Portugal, Italy
Eidmannella Roewer, 1935 — North America, Spain, Japan
Gaucelmus Keyserling, 1884 — Mexico, Central America, Jamaica
Hamus Ballarin & Li, 2015 — Tibet
Kryptonesticus Pavlek & Ribera, 2017 — Europe, New Zealand
Nescina Ballarin & Li, 2015 — China
Nesticella Lehtinen & Saaristo, 1980 — Asia, Africa, Oceania, Brazil
Nesticus Thorell, 1869 — Asia, Africa, Cuba, North America, South America, Europe
Pseudonesticus Liu & Li, 2013 — China
Speleoticus Ballarin & Li, 2016 — China, Japan
Typhlonesticus Kulczyński, 1914 — Europe
Wraios Ballarin & Li, 2015 — China

The following extinct genera have been placed in the Nesticidae:

†Balticonesticus Wunderlich, 1986 – Palaeogene, Baltic amber
†Eopopino Petrunkevitch, 1942 – Palaeogene, Baltic and Bitterfeld amber
†Heteronesticus Wunderlich, 1986 – Palaeogene, Baltic amber
†Hispanonesticus Wunderlich, 1986 – Neogene, Dominican amber

See also 
 List of Nesticidae species

References